Samedli is a village in the municipality of Gushgara in the Goygol District of Azerbaijan.

References

Populated places in Goygol District